Djenane Machado (10 June 1951 – 23 March 2022) was a Brazilian actress.

Life and career
Born in Rio de Janeiro, the daughter of an impresario  and of a costume designer, Machado began her career as a child actress taking part in a stage adaptation of  The Sound of Music, and at 17 she made her television debut in the telenovela Passo dos Ventos.

Machado continued working in numerous Rede Globo telenovelas until the early 1980s, when she started appearing in several Rede Manchete and TV Cultura series. Married and divorced twice, in 1992 after the death of her father she retired from showbusiness and disappeared from the public scene. Machado died on 23 March 2022, at the age of 70.

References

External links 
 
 Djenane Machado at Enciclopédia Itaú Cultural

1951 births
2022 deaths
Actresses from Rio de Janeiro (city)
Brazilian film actresses
Brazilian stage actresses
Brazilian television actresses
Brazilian television presenters
Deaths from emphysema